George Harmon (born 8 December 2000) is an English professional footballer who plays as a defender for Scottish Premiership club Ross County. He has previously played for Oxford City.

Club career

West Brom
Harmon started his career with West Bromwich Albion coming through their youth tanks and playing for their under-21 team in the EFL Trophy.

Oxford City
On 6 August 2021, following his release from West Bromwich Albion earlier that summer, Harmon signed for National League South side Oxford City following a trial with the club. Harmon made 43 appearances for the club, scoring seven goals, and won the Supporters’ Player of the Season award.

Ross County
On 22 June 2022, Harmon signed a two-year contract with Ross County. On 19 July 2022, Harmon made his first start for the club after he replaced Ben Purrington in Ross County’s 2–0 victory against Alloa Athletic in the Scottish League Cup. On 6 August 2022, Harmon made his first appearance in the Scottish Premiership in a 3–1 defeat to Celtic after he replace Jordy Hiwula.

Career statistics

References

External links 
 
 
 Profile at Ross County F.C. website

Living people
2000 births
English footballers
Association football defenders
Oxford City F.C. players
Ross County F.C. players
Scottish Professional Football League players